The Connecticut Coyotes were an arena football franchise based in Hartford, Connecticut. The Coyotes played in the Eastern Division of the National Conference in the Arena Football League.

History

On June 22, 1994, the Arena Football League awarded the state of Connecticut an expansion franchise, and chose the name "Coyotes" in October of the same year. After a tough first season, in which the Coyotes finished 1-11, team president Robert B. Dixon announced that the team would be up for sale. On October 26, 1995, Connecticut Development Authority sold the Coyotes to Ben Morris and Scott Gerard for $750,000. Morris wasted no time hiring Lary Kuharich to become the second coach in Coyotes history.

However, a horrendous record of only 3 wins in 26 games over 2 seasons led to a disbandment of the team following the 1996 season, after Morris failed to sell the franchise to the Madison Square Garden.

The city of Hartford would receive another team in 1999 when the New York CityHawks became the New England Sea Wolves. However, this team's tenure in the city would also be short-lived, as the team moved to Toronto following the 2000 season.

Season-by-season

|-
|1995 || 1 || 11 || 0 || 3rd NC Eastern || --
|-
|1996 || 2 || 12 || 0 || 3rd NC Eastern || --
|-
!Totals || 3 || 23 || 0
|colspan="2"| (including playoffs)
|}

Notable players

All-Arena players
The following Coyotes players were named to All-Arena Teams:
 FB/LB Les Barley (1)

Notable coaches

Head coaches
Note: Statistics are correct through the end of the 1996 Arena Football League season.

References

External links
 Connecticut Coyotes at ArenaFan.com

 
American football teams established in 1995
Sports clubs disestablished in 1996
American football teams in Connecticut
1995 establishments in Connecticut
1996 disestablishments in Connecticut